World Affairs Seminar (WAS) is an annual week-long international student leadership conference. The program, whose theme changes each year, discusses the ways in which young leaders can promote change and become involved in finding solutions to current world issues. This event's audience mainly consists of students aged 16–18 within the United States, Canada, and other countries around the world. These students are considered delegates of their area. The conference has given students exposure to people who have worked in government, international organizations, media, and business.

History
The World Affairs Seminar was founded in 1977 by professors Gaylon Greenhill and Dale Brock. Brock became the first WAS General Manager. In 2017, its fortieth year, students from 35 countries attended.

Themes
WAS has covered topics including human rights, nuclear arms control and disarmament, economics, environmental issues, global health, globalization, security, and global leadership, with an emphasis on ways that students can make a difference in their communities and beyond.

World Affairs Seminar 2002 (26th) - "Is Peace Possible in an Age of Global Terror?"
World Affairs Seminar 2003 (27th) - "Making Peace: Managing Conflict"
World Affairs Seminar 2004 (28th) - "Making Peace by Understanding Conflict"
World Affairs Seminar 2005 (29th) - "Globalisation and Tradition: Two Roads Diverge?"
World Affairs Seminar 2006 (30th) - "Global Leadership Rising Powers: Who Counts?"
World Affairs Seminar 2007 (31st) - "Global Health: Bridging the Divides"
World Affairs Seminar 2009 (32nd) - "World Hunger: Ethical Dilemma of Our Time"
World Affairs Seminar 2010 (33rd) - "The Global Fresh Water Challenge"
World Affairs Seminar 2011 (34th) - "Sustainable Development"
World Affairs Seminar 2012 (35th) - "Global Communication 2.0: Technology's Impact on International Understanding"
World Affairs Seminar 2013 (36th) - "Gender Equity/Social Justice: Moral Imperative of our Time"
World Affairs Seminar 2014 (37th) - "World Health: Issues & Responsibilities" 
World Affairs Seminar 2015 (38th) - "Global Energy: Who's Got the Power?"
World Affairs Seminar 2016 (39th) - "Water: A Global Resource to Share and Protect"
World Affairs Seminar 2017 (40th) - "Education and Social Justice"
World Affairs Seminar 2018 (41st) - "Innovation: Shaping the World You Will Inherit"
World Affairs Seminar 2019 (42nd) - "The Promise & Perils of Social Media"
World Affairs Seminar 2020 (43rd) - "Hunger in a World of Plenty" [Virtual]
World Affairs Seminar 2021 (44th) - "Cities: Urban Life in a Changing World" [Virtual]
World Affairs Seminar 2022 (45th) - "Reimagining Global Health and Wellness: Contagious Ideas" [Virtual]

Past Keynote Speakers 

Dr. Magda Peck - Dean, UW Milwaukee School of Public Health
Will Allen - Former Professional Basketball Player/head of "Growing Power"
Peter Anin – Author of The Great Lakes Water Wars
Dr. Stephen Hargarten - Chair, Medical College of Wisconsin World Health Program
Peter Sawyer - Pulitzer Foundation
Fred de Sam Lazaro - PBS NewsHour Correspondent
Vice Admiral Ann Rondeau - IBM Corporation, former Dean, National Defense University
Peter Menzel & Faith D’Aluisio - Authors of “The Hungry Planet”
Dr. Oscar Arias - former President of Costa Rica and Nobel Prize Winner
Dr. Akbar S. Ahmed - Ibn Khaladun Chair of Islamic Studies, American University
Eric Plantenberg - President, Freedom Personal Development
Wendy Baumann - President, Wisconsin Women's Business Initiative Corp
RADM David P. Aucoin - USN Director, Programming Division, US Navy
Sahar Maher El-Issawi – Egyptian journalist & Blogger
Geneva Bolton Johnson - Retired President, Family Service America
Dr. Cary Silverstein - International Organizational Consultant
Jay Burdette - Sears China Division
Dith Pran - New York Times photojournalist
Dr. William Schultz - Executive Director, Amnesty International
Elaine Chao - Distinguished Fellow, The Heritage Foundation, Washington D.C.
Jean-Michel Cousteau - France, Environmentalist
Jeanne Kirkpatrick - Former U.S. Ambassador to the UN & Cabinet Member
Giandomenico Picco - Former Assistant Secretary-General of the United Nations
Evan Thomas - Assistant Managing Editor, Newsweek Magazine

Sponsors
Rotary District 6270 economically assists students who have shown leadership in their community, exceptional work in their school studies, and dedication in helping their communities.

Other organizations that sponsor students include: Lion's Club, local school districts, Kiwanis, and Optimist Clubs

References

External links
World Affairs Seminar Official Website

International conferences
International relations education
Leadership studies